Edward James Hagan  (1879–1956) was a 20th-century Scottish minister and biblical scholar. He served as Moderator of the General Assembly of the Church of Scotland in 1944.

Life

He studied divinity at Queen's University, Belfast graduating BA. He was ordained in the United Free Church of Scotland around 1902.

He served as a chaplain attached to the 15th Scottish Division in the First World War and received a military OBE and the Military Cross.

In 1922 he received an honorary doctorate (DD).

He became minister of Warrender Church, sited near Bruntsfield Links in south-west Edinburgh. He served here 1926 to 1951. In 1929 the United Free Church of Scotland re-united with the Church of Scotland and he thereafter served as a minister of the Church of Scotland. His church survives but was converted to flats in the 1980s.

In 1944 he succeeded Very Rev John Baillie as Moderator of the General Assembly.

He retired in 1951 and died in 1956.

References

1879 births
1956 deaths
20th-century Christian biblical scholars
British biblical scholars
Moderators of the General Assembly of the Church of Scotland
20th-century Ministers of the Church of Scotland
Calvinist and Reformed biblical scholars